Sir Richard John Harrison  (8 October 1920 – 17 October 1999) was a professor of anatomy at the University of Cambridge.

He was the Fullerian Professor of Physiology from 1961 until 1967, and elected a Fellow of the Royal Society in 1973.  He was elected President of the Anatomical Society of Great Britain and Ireland for 1977 to 1979.

References

1920 births
1999 deaths
Fellows of the Royal Society
Fullerian Professors of Physiology
Professors of Anatomy (Cambridge)
Knights Bachelor